Carl Gerard McHugh (born 5 February 1993) is an Irish professional footballer who plays as a defensive midfielder for Indian Super League club ATK Mohun Bagan. He can also play as a centre-back or left-back.

Club career

Early career
Born in Lettermacaward, County Donegal, McHugh signed a scholarship with English club Reading at the age of 16. He spent loan spells at Swindon Supermarine and Dundalk. He spent one year as a professional at Reading before being released in the summer of 2012.

Bradford City
McHugh signed for Bradford City in August 2012. He made his professional debut for Bradford City on 28 August 2012, in a League Cup match against Watford. He made his debut in The Football League on 27 October 2012, coming on as a substitute in the 1–0 defeat away at Burton Albion.

In November, he starred and scored an equalising header for Bradford City in their FA Cup victory over Northampton Town. Earlier that month, McHugh had been praised by his manager for his performance against Wigan Athletic in the League Cup, and he later commented that his recent spell of first-team games had been a "huge learning curve" for him. McHugh's performances were praised by teammate Rory McArdle.

Following Bradford City's elimination of Aston Villa in the League Cup semi-final, McHugh was photographed waving the flag of his native county on the pitch at Villa Park. He later said, "That was the highlight of the night for me. Back in Bradford they might have thought it was the Irish flag, but they know now that it is the Donegal flag." In the run-up to the 2013 Football League Cup Final, which McHugh played in, he was cited as an "unsung hero" of the Bradford City team. In the latter stages of the 2012–13 season, he began to be played more as a left-back. In June 2013, McHugh was praised by former Bradford City left-back Wayne Jacobs. In July 2013, McHugh signed a new one-year contract with Bradford City, and later that month he spoke about his fight to become a first-team member in the forthcoming season.

In November 2013, McHugh publicly spoke about his lack of first-team football. By 17 January 2014, however, he had played three of the club's last four games, and he credited a sports psychologist for helping him regain his first-team spot.

Plymouth Argyle
On 16 June 2014, McHugh signed a two-year contract with Plymouth Argyle. He played 50 games for Plymouth in his first season at the club, mainly at centre-back alongside Peter Hartley and Curtis Nelson. During the 2014–15 season Plymouth had one of the best defensive records in the league.

Following the arrival of new Plymouth manager Derek Adams in the summer of 2015, McHugh was moved further up the field into a midfield role. He played all season in midfield, earning a lot of praise for his performances throughout the season.

Motherwell
On 5 July 2016, McHugh signed a two-year contract with Motherwell. His signing was met with much controversy, signing for Motherwell despite previously agreeing terms to extend his contract with previous club Plymouth Argyle in writing. McHugh suffered a serious head injury – a two inch deep gash above his right eye – on the opening day of the season against Kilmarnock on 6 August 2016. Motherwell manager Mark McGhee later said that the nature of the injury meant the club could not put a timescale on McHugh's return. He made his comeback on 28 December 2016, away to Inverness Caledonian Thistle. On 4 February 2017, McHugh was sent off during a Scottish Premiership match with Hearts following a challenge on Don Cowie. Motherwell went on to lose the game 3–0, with Mark McGhee blaming the McHugh red card for losing the game. On 4 March 2017, he scored his first Motherwell goal in a 2–1 win away to Kilmarnock. In June 2017 it was announced that McHugh would be Motherwell's new captain, before signing a new two-year contract with the club on 27 July 2017.

Ahead of the 2018–19 season McHugh gave up his role as captain, saying it was best for both himself and the club.

ATK
In May 2019 McHugh signed for Indian club ATK. He scored on his debut. He said he chose to play in India because of its improving standards. McHugh's debut season with ATK ended early for him due to injury, although the club secured the ISL championship title.

He joined ATK Mohun Bagan after ATK merged with Mohun Bagan in 2020. With the club, he began 2022–23 season on 20 August 2022 against Rajasthan United at the 131st edition of Durand Cup as his team lost the match by 3–2.

International career
Having previously played for them at under-17 and under-19 levels, McHugh was called up to the Republic of Ireland under-21 squad in January 2013. He made his debut for the under-21 on 6 February 2013, appearing as a second-half substitute in a 3–0 victory over the Netherlands. McHugh was recalled to the Irish under-21 squad in March 2013, and he earned a second cap for the under-21s on 25 March 2013. He was re-called to the under-21 squad in October 2013 for two Euro Championship qualifiers.

Personal life
McHugh played Gaelic football for Na Rossa, where he was coached by All-Ireland winner Declan Bonner. He is a close friend of Donegal Gaelic footballer Patrick McBrearty. McHugh's footballing hero is Shay Given, who also comes from Donegal.

Career statistics

Club

Honours
Bradford City
Football League Two play-offs: 2013
League Cup runner-up: 2012–13

ATK Mohun Bagan
Indian Super League runner-up: 2020–21

ATK Mohun Bagan
Indian Super League winner: 2022-23

References

1993 births
Living people
People from Kilcar
Association footballers from County Donegal
Gaelic footballers who switched code
Na Rossa Gaelic footballers
English Football League players
League of Ireland players
Reading F.C. players
Swindon Supermarine F.C. players
Dundalk F.C. players
Bradford City A.F.C. players
Plymouth Argyle F.C. players
Motherwell F.C. players
Republic of Ireland association footballers
Republic of Ireland youth international footballers
Republic of Ireland under-21 international footballers
Association football defenders
Association football midfielders
Scottish Professional Football League players
ATK (football club) players
Republic of Ireland expatriate association footballers
Irish expatriate sportspeople in England
Irish expatriate sportspeople in Scotland
Irish expatriate sportspeople in India
Expatriate footballers in England
Expatriate footballers in Scotland
Expatriate footballers in India
Indian Super League players
ATK Mohun Bagan FC players